"Girls in the City" is a song written by Tony Hester and performed by The Esquires. It reached No. 18 on the US R&B chart and No. 120 on the Billboard pop chart in 1971.

The song was produced by Bill Sheppard and Walter Gardner and arranged by Mike Terry.

References

1971 songs
1971 singles
The Esquires songs